Unfaithfully Yours is a 1984 American romantic comedy film directed by Howard Zieff, starring Dudley Moore and Nastassja Kinski and featuring Armand Assante and Albert Brooks.  The screenplay was written by Valerie Curtin, Barry Levinson, and Robert Klane based on Preston Sturges' screenplay for the 1948 film of the same name. The original music score is by Bill Conti and the song "Unfaithfully Yours (One Love)" was written for the film and performed by Stephen Bishop.

Plot
Claude Eastman (Dudley Moore) is a composer and the conductor of a prestigious symphony who has recently married beautiful Daniella (Nastassja Kinski), a much younger woman.  While travelling, he sends a message to his friend Norman Robbins (Albert Brooks) to keep an eye on his wife, but the message is garbled by Claude's Italian valet Giuseppe (Richard Libertini), and instead of looking after Daniella, Norman hires a private detective named Keller (Richard B. Shull) to investigate her.

The private eye's report, which comes with a fuzzy video, is that Daniella had an assignation with a man who, by wearing Argyle socks, appears to be Maxmillian Stein (Armand Assante), a handsome violinist with the orchestra – and Claude's protégé – who is well known as a ladies man. In fact, Max merely used Claude's flat for an assignation with Norman's wife Carla.

Claude attempts to surprise Max and Daniella together, leading Max and Carla to believe that he knows about their affair. When Max eventually meets Daniella, it is at a restaurant where Claude, overwhelmed with jealousy, duels Max with violins by playing a Csárdás, the famous composition of Vittorio Monti.

Claude separately confronts both Daniella and Max. Daniella feels guilty because she is keeping the affair a secret from her husband, while Max apologises only for using Claude's flat for the affair. Not realising that Claude believes Max was meeting Daniella, neither of them clarifies that Max was meeting Carla, and Claude takes this as confirmation of his suspicions, while he is enraged by their apparent lack of contrition. He plots to kill both of them.

As he conducts Tchaikovsky's "Violin Concerto", the full elaborate plan to kill Daniella and frame Max for the murder runs through his mind, leaving him laughing hysterically, but afterwards, when he tries to carry out his plan, unforeseen circumstances intervene.

Meanwhile, Keller realises his mistake after seeing Carla leave Claude's apartment on the tape. After failing to catch Claude at the concert to explain, he goes to Claude's flat and interrupts him while he is struggling to carry out his murder plan. Daniella is initially furious when she learns the truth - seemingly more because Claude believed she was unfaithful than because he planned to kill her - and leaves. Claude rushes after her and explains that he loves her but doesn't think he can stop being jealous, and the two reconcile.

Cast
 Dudley Moore as Claude Eastman
 Nastassja Kinski as Daniella Eastman
 Armand Assante as Maxmillian Stein
 Albert Brooks as Norman Robbins
 Cassie Yates as Carla Robbins
 Richard Libertini as Giuseppe
 Richard B. Shull as Jess Keller
 Jan Triska as Jerzy Czyrek
 Jane Hallaren as Janet
 Bernard Behrens as Bill Lawrence
 Leonard Mann as Screen lover

Cast notes:
 Betty Shabazz, the widow of Malcolm X has a small part in the film.

Production
The project to remake Preston Sturges' 1948 film, which was an artistic success but not a financial one, was originally intended for Peter Sellers, before his death in 1980.

Reception
Unfaithfully Yours received generally mixed to negative reviews from critics, and currently holds a 33% "Rotten" approval rating at review aggregator Rotten Tomatoes. In spite of the lukewarm critical reception, the film was a minor commercial success.

References

External links
 
 
 
 
 Review in The New York Times

1984 films
1984 romantic comedy films
20th Century Fox films
American romantic comedy films
Remakes of American films
1980s English-language films
Films scored by Bill Conti
Films about classical music and musicians
Films based on works by Preston Sturges
Films directed by Howard Zieff
1980s American films